Andronikos II Palaiologos (25 March 1259 – 13 February 1332), Latinized as Andronicus II Palaeologus, reigned as Byzantine emperor from 1282 to 1328. Andronikos' reign marked the beginning of the recently-restored empire's final decline. The Turks conquered most of its remaining Anatolian territories and, during the last years of his reign, he also had to fight his own grandson in the First Palaiologan Civil War. The war ended in Andronikos' forced abdication in 1328 after which he retired to a monastery for the remainder of his life.

Life

Andronikos was born on 25 March 1259, at Nicaea. He was the eldest surviving son of Michael VIII Palaiologos and Theodora Palaiologina, grandniece of John III Doukas Vatatzes.

Andronikos was acclaimed co-emperor in 1261, after his father Michael VIII recovered Constantinople from the Latin Empire, but he was not crowned until 8 November 1272. Sole emperor from 1282, Andronikos II immediately repudiated his father's unpopular Church union with the Papacy, which he had been forced to support while his father was still alive, but he was unable to resolve the related schism within the Orthodox clergy until 1310.

Andronikos II was also plagued by economic difficulties. During his reign the value of the Byzantine hyperpyron depreciated precipitously, while the state treasury accumulated less than one seventh the revenue (in nominal coins) that it had previously. Seeking to increase revenue and reduce expenses, Andronikos II raised taxes, reduced tax exemptions, and dismantled the Byzantine fleet (80 ships) in 1285, thereby making the Empire increasingly dependent on the rival republics of Venice and Genoa. 

In 1291, he hired 50–60 Genoese ships, but the Byzantine weakness resulting from the lack of a navy became painfully apparent in the two wars with Venice in 1296–1302, and later again in 1306–10. In 1320, he tried to resurrect the navy by constructing 20 galleys, but failed.

Andronikos II Palaiologos sought to resolve some of the problems facing the Byzantine Empire through diplomacy. After the death of his first wife, Anne of Hungary, he married Yolanda (renamed Irene) of Montferrat, putting an end to the Montferrat claim to the Kingdom of Thessalonica. 

Andronikos II also attempted to marry off his son and co-emperor Michael IX Palaiologos to the Latin Empress Catherine I of Courtenay, thus seeking to eliminate Western agitation for a restoration of the Latin Empire. Another marriage alliance attempted to resolve the potential conflict with Serbia in Macedonia, as Andronikos II married off his five-year-old daughter Simonis to King Stefan Milutin in 1298.

In spite of the resolution of problems in Europe, Andronikos II was faced with the collapse of the Byzantine frontier in Asia Minor, despite the successful, but short, governorships of Alexios Philanthropenos and John Tarchaneiotes. The successful military victories in Asia Minor by Alexios Philanthropenos and John Tarchaneiotes against the Turks were largely dependent on a considerable military contingent of Cretan escapees, or exiles from Venetian-occupied Crete, headed by Hortatzis, whom Michael VIII had repatriated to Byzantium through a treaty agreement with the Venetians ratified in 1277. Andronikos II had resettled those Cretans in the region of Meander river, the southeastern Asia Minor frontier of Byzantium with the Turks.

After the failure of the co-emperor Michael IX to stem the Turkish advance in Asia Minor in 1302 and the disastrous Battle of Bapheus, the Byzantine government hired the Catalan Company of Almogavars (adventurers from Catalonia) led by Roger de Flor to clear Byzantine Asia Minor of the enemy. 

In spite of some successes, the Catalans were unable to secure lasting gains. Being more ruthless and savage than the enemy they intended to subdue they quarreled with Michael IX, and eventually openly turned on their Byzantine employers after the murder of Roger de Flor in 1305; together with a party of willing Turks they devastated Thrace, Macedonia, and Thessaly on their road to Latin occupied southern Greece. There they conquered the Duchy of Athens and Thebes. The Turks continued to penetrate the Byzantine possessions, and Prusa fell in 1326. 

By the end of Andronikos II's reign, much of Bithynia was in the hands of the Ottoman Turks of Osman I and his son and heir Orhan. 

Karasids conquered Mysia-region with Paleokastron after 1296, Germiyan conquered Simav in 1328, Saruhan captured Magnesia in 1313, and Aydinids captured Smyrna in 1310.

The conflict ended with yet another dynastic marriage, between Michael IX's daughter Theodora and the Bulgarian emperor. The dissolute behavior of Michael IX's son Andronikos III Palaiologos led to a rift in the family, and after Michael IX's death in 1320, Andronikos II disowned his grandson, prompting a civil war that raged, with interruptions, until 1328. The conflict precipitated Bulgarian involvement, and Michael Asen III of Bulgaria attempted to capture Andronikos II under the guise of sending him military support. In 1328 Andronikos III entered Constantinople in triumph and Andronikos II was forced to abdicate.

Andronikos II died as a monk at Constantinople in 1332, and was buried in the Lips Monastery (now the Fenari Isa Mosque).

Fiscal Policy 
The economic destitution which would plague the reign of Andronikos II caused him to undertake drastic measures to cut state spending. These spending cuts included the native army which was reduced to a near token force being largely superseded by foreign mercenary companies who however too would be further reduced down to a near suicidal minimum and be in large part replaced by cheaper but much less experienced rabble, such that a military response to the turk advance became a difficult and as shown by the failed Campaign of Andronikos’s co-emperor Michael XI a dangerous undertaking. 

The Byzantine Navy was not left unharmed. In fact it would soon be disbanded completely, leaving the Byzantine State more than ever reliant on Genoese and Venetian assistance — which correspondingly allowed these republics to charge exorbitantly higher prices for their service — the great deal of experienced seamen who were as a result made unemployed also had the disastrous effect of giving the Turkomans — who had just reached the western Anatolian coast and sough to build up their own naval forces —a myriad of destitute but experienced Sailors and Ship-makers who they could draw upon to build up their own fleets which would together with the absence of the Byzantine fleet greatly contribute to the exploding problem of Turkic piracy in the Aegean sea ravaging trade and coastal lands alike.

In 1320 as a result of heightened taxation, and a more rigorous collection of these, Andronikos II was able to raise a total of 1 million Hyperpyra for the budgetary year of 1321, this he planned to use to expand his army to some 3000 horsemen, and recreate the Byzantine Navy to contain 20 ships. Andronikos II's impending civil war with his grandson Andronikos III would however prevent him from ever implementing this plan, yet to his credit this plan does show a more militarily ambitious if still insufficient plan for state spending.

For the sake of comparison it has to be noted that the Hyperpyron from 1320 was worth 1/2 that of the undebased Nomisma from the reign of Basil II.

Early Church policy 

As Andronikos broke the church union of his father he also removed many of his church appointments, including the pro-unionist Patriarch John XI, replacing him with the now very elderly anti-unionist Patriarch Joseph I. When Joseph resigned his office and died the following year he was then replaced by a cypriot who took the name Gregory II. 

Aside from the church union Andronikos also faced the Arsenite schism, caused when Patriarch Arsenios protested the blinding and imprisonment of John IV undertaken by Michael VIII, consequently excommunicating Michael VIII for which Arsenios was soon removed. The Arsenites were an anti-unionist group which therefore held that the still imprisoned John was the rightful Byzantine Emperor and that the Patriarchs John XI, Joseph I, and now Gregory II were illegitimate. 

To try and mend this schism Gregory called for a church synod to which he invited both the Patriarchs of Alexandria and Antioch asking them to rescind their previous pro-unionist declaration, which The Patriarch of Antioch refused, who then subsequently abdicated from his office and fled to Syria. Gregory also asked Michael VIIIs widow the Empress Theodora for a public avowal that she would never ask that Michael receive a Christian burial, which she ended up agreeing to. Though this Synod did much to satisfy the Orthodox Clergy it failed to do the same with the Arsenites.

A few years later, the Patriarch Gregory II was forced to resign as some of his writings were deemed to be heretical. Andronikos, in order to distract from an ever worsening political situation, succeeded in having a hermit from Mt. Athos, who took the name Athanasius, pronounced as Patriarch. Athanasius became known for his simplistic dress and near fanatical Asceticism spending much of his time repudiating clergymen for their earthly possessions. He would eventually go as far as to attempt and take riches away from some wealthier churches and monasteries. Many clergymen as a result became overtly hostile to him going as far as pelting him with stones as he walked the streets of Constantinople, so that Athanasius would soon no longer be seen in public without a personal bodyguard.

When in the summer of 1293 Andronikos returned from a visit to his swiftly dwindling Anatolian holdings he was already awaited by a delegation of leading clergyman who demanded the deposition of Athanasius, Andronikos attempted to resist these calls however the strong opposition eventually forced him to recall Athanasius from his office, this was not however before Athanasius personally penned a church bull in which he excommunicated the leading clergymen who took opposition to him, hiding it in a pillar in the northern Gallery of the Hagia Sophia where it would only be found a few years later causing much uproar.

Family
On 8 November 1272 Andronikos II married as his first wife Anna of Hungary, daughter of Stephen V of Hungary and Elizabeth the Cuman, with whom he had two sons:
 Michael IX Palaiologos (17 April 127712 October 1320).
 Constantine Palaiologos, despotes (1335). Constantine was forced to become a monk by his nephew Andronikos III Palaiologos.

Anna died in 1281, and in 1284 Andronikos married Yolanda (renamed Irene), a daughter of William VII of Montferrat, with whom he had:
 John Palaiologos (–1308), despotes.
 Bartholomaios Palaiologos (born 1289), died young.
 Theodore I, Marquis of Montferrat (1291–1338).
 Simonis Palaiologina (1294 – after 1336), who married King Stefan Milutin of Serbia.
 Theodora Palaiologina (born 1295), died young.
 Demetrios Palaiologos (1297–1343), despotēs.
 Isaakios Palaiologos (born 1299), died young.

Andronikos II also had at least three illegitimate daughters:
 Irene, who first married Ghazan, Khan of Persia, and laterJohn II Doukas, ruler of Thessaly.
 Maria, who married Toqta, Khan of the Golden Horde.
 A daughter known as Despina Khatun, who married Öljaitü, Khan of the Ilkhanate.

Foundations
 Ardenica Monastery
 Panagia Olympiotissa Monastery
 Zograf monastery

See also

List of Byzantine emperors
Rabban Bar Sauma

Notes

References

External links
 

1259 births
1332 deaths
Palaiologos dynasty
13th-century Byzantine emperors
14th-century Byzantine emperors
Monarchs who abdicated
Eastern Orthodox monks
Eastern Orthodox monarchs
Burials at Lips Monastery
Founders of Christian monasteries
Children of Michael VIII Palaiologos
Byzantine people of the Byzantine–Ottoman wars
Sons of Byzantine emperors